Jonathan David Brown (born 27 April 1990) is a Welsh professional footballer and former Wales under-21 international who plays as a winger for USL Championship club OKC Energy FC.

Early life
Born in Bridgend, Brown attended the Archbishop McGrath School as a youngster. Brown also competed in various sports, including rugby and athletics and was the Welsh 100m champion at the 12–14 age group after taking part in the Welsh games.

Brown's father, Steve, was captain of the Wales youth rugby team between 1976 and 1977.

Club career

Cardiff City
Brown was originally spotted by Liverpool scout Gwyn James but was unable to sign for the Merseyside club, due to a rule meaning youth players must sign with a team within one and a half hours of their home, so he recommended him to Cardiff City. Having worked his way through the youth system at Cardiff, Brown made his first team debut against Welshpool Town in the FAW Premier Cup where he scored the only goal of the game with a free-kick to send the Bluebirds into the semi-final, becoming the first Bridgend-born player to play for Cardiff since Billy Rees. He made his league debut for Cardiff on 12 February 2008 against Coventry City when he came off the bench in the closing minutes and made a second appearance later in the season, coming on as a substitute again during a 3–1 win over Blackpool. At the end of the season he was rewarded with a one-year deal at the club, his first professional contract. Brown was the latest in a long line of recent youth players to have broken into the first team with the Bluebirds such as Joe Ledley, Chris Gunter, Darcy Blake and Aaron Ramsey.

Loan at Wrexham
Having not made an appearance for Cardiff during the 2008–09 season, Brown joined Wrexham on a two-month loan deal. He made his debut on 29 November in a 2–1 win over Stevenage Borough, setting up Jefferson Louis to score Wrexham's first goal before being replaced after 88 minutes by Shaun Whalley. He scored his first goal for the club in his very next game when he scored in the 90th minute to give Wrexham a 2–1 win over Kettering Town. On Christmas Eve, Brown was involved in a road accident while travelling back to Wrexham. On his way back from South Wales, Brown's car overturned near Welshpool and he was forced to break one of the vehicles windows in order to escape. Brown kept the incident a secret from Wrexham manager Dean Saunders until after he had played against Barrow on boxing day two days later.

Having been a first team regular during his initial loan spell, in early January it was confirmed that his loan deal had been extended by one month and at the end of the January transfer window the two clubs agreed for the loan deal to last until the end of the season. After the extended deal was agreed, manager Dean Saunders praised the impact Brown had at the side since arriving at the North Wales side. In his next game for the club, Brown scored his fourth goal of the season when he scored direct from a free-kick as Wrexham won 3–2 over Grays Athletic. In total, Brown made 27 appearances in all competitions for the club, scoring four times before returning to Cardiff, where he was released.

Central Coast Mariners
Having spent time on trial at the club, in December 2009 he joined Australian A-League side Central Coast Mariners on a contract until the end of the 2009–10 season, with the option of a possible two-year deal. However, he was released at the end of the season without making an appearance for the first team.

Southport
Following a six-month spell at the Somerset club, Brown signed for Southport, on 2 July 2011, ready for the 2011–12 season. He made his competitive club debut on 13 August 2011 on the first day of the 2011–12 season. He signed for AFC Telford United on loan for the rest of the season on 31 January 2012.

AFC Telford United
Following his release from Southport, Brown joined Telford United on a permanent deal. Jon announced to the fans of Telford that he was leaving them to move to Thailand to play over there. He played his last game at home against Wrexham in a 0–2 loss.

Hereford United
Following a successful trial, Brown signed a three-month contract with Hereford United on 25 July 2013.

Abahani Limited Dhaka
In 2016, Brown joined Bangladeshi club Abahani Limited Dhaka and won the Bangladesh Football Premier League in the same year. He scored his first goal in the AFC Cup on 4 April 2017 against Mohun Bagan A.C. of India.

USL Championship 
Brown joined USL Championship team Oklahoma City Energy FC for the 2017 & 2018 season.
On 30 January 2019 Brown joined USL Championship side Hartford Athletic ahead of their inaugural 2019 season. He rejoined Oklahoma City Energy FC on a loan on 6 June 2019 and transferred back to Oklahama for the 2020 season.

International career
Brown has been a regular at various youth levels for Wales and was part of the under-19 squad that took part in the Milk Cup in 2007. He made his under-21 debut against Malta U21 on 5 February 2008, scoring his first goal for the under-21 side on 31 March 2009 in a 5–1 win over Luxembourg.

Honours

Club
Abahani Limited Dhaka
Bangladesh Football Premier League (1): 2015–16

References

External links
Jonathan Brown player profile at cardiffcityfc.co.uk
 (Cardiff & Wrexham stats)
 (Southport & Bath City stats)

Living people
1990 births
Welsh footballers
Footballers from Bridgend
Association football midfielders
Cardiff City F.C. players
Wrexham A.F.C. players
Central Coast Mariners FC players
Bath City F.C. players
Southport F.C. players
AFC Telford United players
Jonathan Brown
Hereford United F.C. players
Brackley Town F.C. players
Merthyr Town F.C. players
Abahani Limited (Dhaka) players
OKC Energy FC players
Hartford Athletic players
English Football League players
National League (English football) players
Jonathan Brown
Southern Football League players
Bangladesh Football Premier League players
USL Championship players
Wales youth international footballers
Wales under-21 international footballers
Welsh expatriate footballers
Expatriate soccer players in Australia
Welsh expatriate sportspeople in Australia
Expatriate footballers in Belgium
Welsh expatriate sportspeople in Belgium
Expatriate footballers in Thailand
Welsh expatriate sportspeople in Thailand
Expatriate footballers in Bangladesh
Welsh expatriate sportspeople in Bangladesh
Expatriate soccer players in the United States
Welsh expatriate sportspeople in the United States